The 2018 Judo Grand Prix Antalya was held at the Antalya Sports Hall in Antalya, Turkey, from 6 to 8 April 2018.

Medal summary

Men's events

Women's events

Source Results

Medal table

References

External links
 

2018 IJF World Tour
2018 Judo Grand Prix
Judo
Grand Prix 2018
Judo